Bully Creek is a  long tributary of the Malheur River, located in the U.S. state of Oregon. It drains  of Malheur County. Arising in the Blue Mountains, it flows generally southeast to its confluence with the Malheur River near Vale.

Course
Bully Creek's headwaters are located near Sheep Rock in the southern edge of the Blue Mountains, southwest of Ironside. It flows east, receiving Indian and Cottonwood creeks on the right, and Clover Creek on the left. Traveling through the community of Westfall, the creek turns northeast. From the reservoir, the creek flows southeast until it reaches Highway 20. It parallels the highway and the Malheur River for several miles, passing through the outskirts of Vale.

Watershed
Bully Creek drains  of eastern Oregon. Wedged between the Northern Basin and Range and the Blue Mountains ecoregions, the watershed experiences an arid climate.

Flora and fauna
Two hundred and five species of vertebrates have been identified within the Bully Creek watershed. Large mammals such as Rocky Mountain elk and mule deer, bobcats, beavers, otters, and raccoons inhabit the region. Twenty one species of fish have been spotted, but there are no anadromous species. The threatened bald eagle lives in the watershed during the winter.

The Bully Creek watershed is vegetated primarily by Sagebrush, although Quaking Aspen, Water Birch, and Cottonwood grow in riparian zones. Several noxious weeds have been identified, including Russian Knapweed and White Top.

History
The first humans arrived in the Bully Creek watershed about 13,000 years ago. The Northern Paiute tribe of Native Americans migrated to the region approximately 1,000 years ago. Whites first arrived in 1811 when fur traders from the Pacific Fur Company passed through. The Oregon Trail passed through the area in the 1840s, 50s, and 60s.

The Jordan damn was cheaply built only 2 years prior for irrigation purposes by investers who wanted to plant wineries in the Willowcreek Valley. The builders used the naturally found shale rock in the concrete mix leading to the failure of the damn. A railroad bridge and parts of Highway 20 were washed out, and many cattle and properties were destroyed. Overall, the flood caused over $500,000 in damage. Bully Creek Dam was constructed in 1963, used primarily for irrigation and flood control.

See also
 List of longest streams of Oregon
 List of rivers of Oregon

Notes

References

Rivers of Oregon
Rivers of Malheur County, Oregon